Suburban Exotica is a compilation album by the English comedian and singer Lorraine Bowen. It was released on 6 December 2010.

Tracks

External links
 Official Site

References

2010 albums